Ardon (Ærydon) is a town and the administrative center of Ardonsky District in the Republic of North Ossetia-Alania, Russia, located in the center of the republic on the west bank of the Ardon River,  northwest of the republic's capital Vladikavkaz. As of the 2010 Census, its population was 18,774.

History
It was founded in 1824 and was granted town status in 1964.

Administrative and municipal status
Within the framework of administrative divisions, Ardon serves as the administrative center of Ardonsky District. As an administrative division, it is, together with two rural localities (the settlements of Bekan and Stepnoy), incorporated within Ardonsky District as Ardon Town Under District Jurisdiction. As a municipal division, the town of Ardon and the settlement of Bekan (but not the settlement of Stepnoy) are incorporated within Ardonsky Municipal District as Ardonskoye Urban Settlement.

Economy
The town is an important road and rail junction at the head of a branch line to the southern town of Alagir. It grew significantly in the 1960s, transforming into an industrial-agricultural hub with a cannery, a hemp processing factory, and other facilities for food and agricultural processing.

Notable people from Ardon, North Ossetia–Alania
 Diana Avsaragova, Russian mixed martial artist (Bellator Fighting Championships)

References

Notes

Sources

External links
Official website of Ardon 
Directory of organizations in Ardon 

Cities and towns in North Ossetia–Alania